Osich'ŏn station is a railway station in Taeosich'ŏl-lodongjagu, Unhŭng county, Ryanggang province, North Korea, at the end of the Osich'ŏn Line from Taeoch'ŏn on the Paektusan Ch'ŏngnyŏn Line of the Korean State Railway.

History
The station, along with the rest of the Osich'ŏn Line, was opened by the Chosen Government Railway on 1 November 1937.

On 9 October 2006 an underground nuclear test was conducted at P'unggyeri in Kilju County, causing the closure of the line for 3-4 months.

References

Railway stations in North Korea